Ampedus balteatus is a species of beetle from the family Elateridae and the genus Ampedus.

Description
Beetle in length 7-10mm.

References

Beetles described in 1758
Elateridae
Taxa named by Carl Linnaeus